On The Ball was an Australian Special Broadcasting Service (SBS) television talk show about soccer, which began around 1984 and ended in 2002.

The show was mainly hosted by Les Murray and Johnny Warren, but were often joined by other hosts & analysts, including Stephanie Brantz and Francis Awaritefe amongst others. It was well known for promoting the game of football in Australia and endorsing candidates for the Socceroos coaching job and for the board of Soccer Australia (since replaced by the Football Federation Australia).

The show was replaced with The World Game.

See also

List of Australian television series
List of programs broadcast by Special Broadcasting Service

References

Association football television series
Special Broadcasting Service original programming
1990s Australian television series
1984 Australian television series debuts
2002 Australian television series endings
SBS Sport